U.S. Route 70N (US 70N) is a northern alternate to U.S. Route 70, passing through parts of Middle Tennessee and East Tennessee.

Route description

US 70N is a predominantly two-lane rural highway, with divided-four lanes at major intersections only.

The entire route is in concurrency with SR 24; which is recognized as a primary route between Lebanon and Cookeville, and secondary between Cookeville and Crossville.  It also follows closely to Interstate 40, which is a faster and preferable route for travelers.

Wilson County

US 70N begins in Lebanon just east of downtown at an intersection with US 70/SR 26/SR 141 (High Street/Baddour Parkway) and US 70 Business/SR 24 (E Main Street). It heads northeast through neighborhoods to leave Lebanon (concurrent with SR 24) and pass through farmland for several miles to cross into Smith County.

Smith County

It then crosses into Smith County and starts paralleling the Cumberland River to pass through Rome and enter South Carthage. It then passes through downtown before coming to an interchange with SR 25 and SR 53, just across the river from downtown Carthage, the county seat. They then go east, concurrent with SR 53, through countryside as it leaves South Carthage and crosses the Caney Fork River before going through Elmwood and having an intersection with SR 264. It then leaves the Cumberland River, now Cordell Hull Lake, as it begins entering mountains and narrows and becomes curvy as it begins to cross over the Highland Rim. It then passes through Chestnut Mound, where SR 53 separates and turns north. It then rises in elevation, as it enters the Cumberland Plateau, and crosses into Putnam County.

Putnam County

It then has an intersection and becomes concurrent with SR 96 immediately afterwards, and goes east through some more mountains before SR 96 separates and goes north. The road then straightens out and widens as it enters Baxter and just north of town before coming to an intersection with SR 56. It then has an intersection with SR 291 in the Double Springs  community before entering Cookeville. It goes through some neighborhoods and passes by some businesses before entering downtown at an intersection with SR 135, which provides access to Tennessee Technological University (TTU). It then continues through downtown to have an intersection with SR 136 before leaving downtown and continuing through some more neighborhoods to an interchange with SR 111 before having an interchange with I-40 (Exit 290). It then leaves Cookeville and continues east through countryside. It then begins paralleling I-40 and goes through a large wooded area before coming to an intersection with SR 84 and becoming concurrent with it before having another interchange with I-40 (Exit 300), just before entering Monterey. Just before entering downtown, SR 84 separates and enters downtown, having an intersection with SR 62 a couple of blocks away. US 70N/SR 24 turns east and goes through a small neighborhoods before having another interchange with I-40 (Exit 301) before leaving Monterey and going through more countryside, paralleling and crossing the interstate twice before entering Cumberland County.

Cumberland County

It continues through countryside and then farmland to pass through Cumberland Cove before entering Crossville at an intersection with the new SR 462 (Northwest Connector). They then pass by several businesses, where it crosses the Obed River, before coming to an intersection with US 70/SR 1 before turning east and going for 2 blocks before both US 70N/SR 24 both end at an intersection with US 127/SR 28 just north of downtown.

History

Junction list

See also

U.S. Route 70S

References

External links

70 N
70 N
N
Transportation in Wilson County, Tennessee
Transportation in Smith County, Tennessee
Transportation in Putnam County, Tennessee
Transportation in Cumberland County, Tennessee